The Bulldogs FA, also known as the Dawgs, are a Costa Rican American Football team based in San Jose, Costa Rica. They are currently members of FEFACR (American Football Federation of Costa Rica) for its acronym in Spanish. They are currently The Five-time champion on the league. The team, joined the FEFACR in 2008 being one of the league founders. The Dawgs earned their 5th Costa Rica Super Bowl.

Uniform 

The Bulldogs wear two uniforms, their helmets are navy blue with a B on it, their home jersey is navy blue with white and gold numbers with white pants and navy blue socks.

For their away games, they usually wear their second uniform, which consists on the same navy blue helmet, but with a whole white uniform, with navy blue and gold numbers and navy blue socks.

Coaching staff 
 Head coach: Carlos Avila
 Linemen Coach: Gilbert Chávez
 Defensive Coordinator: Paco Wilson
 Defensive Assistant Coach: Danny Monney
 Special Teams Coach: Cisco León

Mascot 

As the team name, their mascot is a bulldog more often known as "Big Papi II". A true bulldog that goes into the field with the team in every game.

Big Papi II is an original Bulldog, it has accompanied the team since the beginning of the Costa Rican Football League.

Regular Season Stats 
Official FEFACR Stats

Costa Rica Super Bowl Championships 

The Bulldogs have won the last 3 Super Bowls, being the first American Football Team in Costa Rica to reach that record.

*2010 Season, the team went undefeated(11-0)

**2012 Season, the team went undefeated(9-0)

Bulldogs International Games 

The Bulldogs have played against international teams representing their Country Costa Rica

Records 

Longest Winning Streak : 14 Games (From Game 4 Season 2011 to IV Costa Rica Super Bowl 2012)
Longest Losing Streak : 3 Games (From Game 6 Season 2009 to Semifinal Game 2009)
Most Points Scored on a Game : 70 Points (Game 4 Season 2012 / Bulldogs 70 - 8 Dragons)
Most Points Granted on a Game : 54 Points (Semifinal Game 2009 / Toros 54 - 0 Bulldogs)
Biggest Winning Difference : 62 Points (Game 4 Season 2012 / Bulldogs 70 - 8 Dragons)
Smallest Winning Difference : 1 Point (Game 5 Season 2009 / Bulldogs 9 - 8 Dragons)
Biggest Losing Difference : 54 Points (Semifinal Game 2009 / Toros 54 - 0 Bulldogs)
Smallest Losing Difference : 13 Points (Game 1 Season 2009 / Bulldogs 6 - 19 Dragons)
Longest Game Played : II Costa Rica Super Bowl (Toros 36 - 39 Bulldogs 3(OT))
Shortest Game Played:  Game 2 Season 2010 (Tiburones 0 - Bulldogs 17 / The game was called off at the 28th minute due to a misconduct of the whole Tiburones Team)

Roster

References

External links 
Official Santa Ana Bulldogs Site
Official Santa Ana Bulldogs Facebook

American football teams
American football teams established in 2008
2008 establishments in Costa Rica